Gaëlle Thalmann (born 18 January 1986) is a Swiss professional footballer who plays as a goalkeeper for Spanish Liga F club Real Betis and the Switzerland national team.

Club career 
Thalmann started her career at the age of nine with FC Bulle on a boys' team coached by her father. She played forward at this time and later switched to goalkeeper at age 14, when she advanced to the women's team FC Riaz. Two years later she joined FC Vétroz in Nationalliga B, the second highest tier of football in Switzerland. 

Her first senior camp was FC Rot-Schwarz Thun, where she suffered a serious anterior cruciate ligament injury. After one year, she switched to FFC Zuchwil 05, with whom she became vice-champion and league cup winner in 2006. This was followed by a move to FC Luzern Frauen. After a trial at 1. FFC Turbine Potsdam, she signed a contract there on January 8, 2008 until June 30, 2009, joining the Bundesliga, the top league of football in Germany. Her first Bundesliga game was completed on February 24, 2008 in an away game against Hamburger SV. In 2009 she won with her team the DFB indoor cup and the German Championship. For the 2009/10 season she moved to Hamburger SV.  In 2010 she returned to Switzerland, with Grasshopper. She played with 1. FC Lokomotive Leipzig, and then joined top level Italian Serie A club ASD Torres. In the summer of 2014 she moved to MSV Duisburg. After MSV Duisburg's relegation to the second division, Thalmann returned to Switzerland and signed for FC Basel.  In 2016 she moved to the Italian league for A.S.D. Bardolino Verona C.F. In the summer of 2019 she left Italy to return to Switzerland, to Servette Chênois. She played at Servette Chênois for two seasons, before moving to Real Betis in Spain in July 2021.

International career 
Thalmann played her first international match with the Swiss U19 national team on October 6, 2002 in the match won by Switzerland 5-0 against the selection of Hungary in the first qualifying round for the UEFA European U19 Championship. She took part in the U20 World Cup in Russia. 

Thalmann represents Switzerland on a senior level since June 17, 2007. Her debut was in a friendly match, playing for one half against Sweden. Stenia Michel took over as Switzerland's first-choice goalkeeper in the run up to the 2015 FIFA World Cup, when Thalmann had her anterior cruciate ligament injury. Thalmann took part in the 2022 European Championship and played in goal for the Swiss team in all three group games. Switzerland was eliminated after the preliminary round.

Titles
Club

 German Championship: 1
 Potsdam turbines: 2008-2009

 Italian League: 1
 Torres: 2012-2013

 Swiss cup: 1
 Zuchwil 05: 2005-2006

 German Cup: 1
 Potsdam Turbines: 2009

 Italian Super Cup: 2
 Torres: 2012, 2013

National

 Cyprus Women's Cup: 1

 2017

Personal

 Award for sporting merit in the Canton of Fribourg

References

External links

Torres profile

1986 births
Living people
1. FFC Turbine Potsdam players
Hamburger SV (women) players
MSV Duisburg (women) players
Torres Calcio Femminile players
A.S.D. AGSM Verona F.C. players
Swiss women's footballers
Expatriate women's footballers in Germany
Expatriate women's footballers in Italy
Swiss expatriate sportspeople in Germany
Swiss expatriate sportspeople in Italy
Switzerland women's international footballers
People from Bulle
2015 FIFA Women's World Cup players
Frauen-Bundesliga players
Women's association football goalkeepers
Fiorentina Women's F.C. players
Swiss Women's Super League players
Grasshopper Club Zürich (women) players
FC Basel Frauen players
U.S. Sassuolo Calcio (women) players
Atalanta Mozzanica Calcio Femminile Dilettantistico players
Serie A (women's football) players
Sportspeople from the canton of Fribourg
UEFA Women's Euro 2022 players
UEFA Women's Euro 2017 players
Swiss expatriate women's footballers
FIFA Century Club
FFC Zuchwil 05 players